Brong can refer to:
 Brong-Ahafo region, a former region in southern Ghana
 Brong-Solanki in Ghana
 Abron language, also known as Brong, in Ghana